is a Japanese manga series written and illustrated by Konami Sonoda. It was first serialized in the magazine Ribon Original in 2003 and was moved to the main Ribon magazine in March 2004. The series was put on hiatus in the September 2019 issue of Ribon due to Sonoda's poor health, and she later died from breast cancer on August 4, 2019.

In Japan, the series was popular among elementary and junior high school students, with critics citing the fashion focus and emphasis on friendship as its strong points. The popularity of the series led to a live-action television drama adaptation in 2007.

Plot
ChocoMimi follows the daily lives of best friends Choco and Mimi, two fashionable junior high girls, as well as their own social circle and family. While Choco is serious and diligent, spoiled sweet Mimi is imaginative and spacey. Together, they experience and explore everyday problems at home, with their friends, and at school. Each chapter ends with a fashion tip from both Choco and Mimi.

Characters

Main characters
 /  
; portrayed by Yukika Teramoto (TV series)
Choco is a gentle and reliable teenager who does well in school and has a liking towards fashion. She is best friends with Mimi and often tries to serve as a figure of responsibility amidst the former's antics. She enjoys cooking and creating crafts. Some jokes in the manga revolve around her poor singing and drawing abilities. Her family runs a cafe called the March Rabbit; she herself hopes to find a future of opening her own cafe.

; portrayed by Kayano Masuyama (TV series)
Mimi is a carefree, optimistic girl. She is a poor student and often tries to slide out from working on her schoolwork, but she has a wild, amusing imagination. Most of her daydreams consist of finding true loves and secret worlds. She claims Mikami is her "dream prince," although she is shown to have feelings towards Mumu. She owns a plush bear toy named , a recurring mascot in the manga.

 / 
; portrayed by Yuya Kido (TV series)
Andō is transfer student from Osaka who is quiet and plays guitar in a band. He is intimidating at first glance, but he is kind and cares deeply for animals. He is good friends with Choco, although their relationship becomes awkward at times due to their feelings for each other.

; portrayed by Tōko Miura (TV series)
A mischievous student with a self-centered attitude that causes him to constantly clash with Mimi. He has a very cute, feminine appearance that he takes pride in. He has feelings for Mimi and gets easily jealous when Mimi tends to favor Mikami instead of himself. He adores Mimi's dog, Chiffon. Like Mimi, he is a poor student and despises school and homework. He owns a plush bear toy named , a counterpart to Mimi's Pirate Bear.

 / 
Portrayed by: Masahiro Usui (TV series)
Ando's classmate whom Mimi compares to a prince. He is a good student and does well academically, but he is rather air-headed and prone to making bizarre comments. He is Mr. Take's nephew.

 / 
Portrayed by: Ayame Gouriki (TV series)
Bambi is Ando's level-headed, tomboyish childhood friend. She loves singing and playing sports. She has slight feelings for Ando but puts them aside for Choco and Ando's relationship. In spite of this, she is very close to Choco and gets along well with the rest of the group.

Other characters
 / 
Portrayed by: Taro Suwa (TV series)
Choco, Mimi, and Mumu's homeroom teacher. He is constantly exasperated by Mimi's shortcomings and is often frustrated with her inability to concentrate on her studies. He is also the uncle of Mikami and Aoi.

 
Misaki is a third-year student and Choco and Mimi's senior. She is very pretty, but is rather eccentric. At times, she behaves in an outlandish, almost stalker-like manner due to her extreme crush on Mr. Take, which often disturbs the others. She was introduced in the fourth volume.

 / 
Abe is a third-year student who is the captain of the soccer team. He is friendly and has a crush on Choco. He remains on good terms with her and her friends even after she turns him down.

A classmate of Choco and Mimi who is extremely popular in their class. He has a crush on Misaki and has been in love with her since he saw her at the entrance ceremony. He does not understand Misaki's obsession with Mr. Take.

 / 
Maho-Maho is Mimi's old friend from her childhood. They knew each other when they were young and had made a promise to marry each other, although Mimi has forgotten about it. Mumu is jealous of him. He is honest, though not very bright, which pleases Mimi to see that someone is duller than herself. He works in the library with Mikami. He was introduced in the sixth volume.

 
A shy and pessimistic first-year student who has a crush on Mumu. She was friendless before meeting Mumu and the gang. She was introduced in the seventh volume.

 / 
A beautiful but narcissistic first-year student. She is constantly competing with Mumu over who has the best appearance. She claims that she will not fall in love with any other person because she is in love with herself. She was introduced in the seventh volume.

Family members

Portrayed by: Kousei Amano (TV series)
Mimi's father who dotes on her and honors her every request. He becomes upset whenever she is disappointed in his actions.

Portrayed by: Reo Sawada (TV series)
Choco's energetic, youngest brother in the fifth grade. He and Ando get along very well with each other due their hobby of playing video games. He has a crush on Aoi.

Choco's second younger brother. He is usually poker-faced and very stoic; the others often comment on how he does not look related to his siblings. He is a year younger than Choco. Mimi and Mumu often tease him by calling him the name "Rachel," which he dislikes. He is often compared to Ando on their similar appearances and behaviors. He was introduced in the fourth volume.

Portrayed by: Kana Okunoyama (TV series)
Mikami's sweet younger sister, whom Jin has a crush on. She is a year older than Jin and loves reading.

Animals

 (TV series)
Mimi's pet dog who communicates in an archaic dialect. He dislikes it when Mimi dresses him up, as he believes himself to be a samurai.

 (TV series)
Choco's sassy, female pet cat.

 
Ando's female pet chick, whom he constantly dotes on.

A kitten that was found by Choco and Mimi at school, whom Mumu takes in.

Media

Manga

ChocoMimi debuted on Ribon Original in 2003. After the magazine became defunct in 2004, it was moved to Ribon. The chapters were later released in bound volumes by Shueisha for a total of 11 volumes under the Ribon Mascot Comics imprint. Sonoda put the series on hiatus beginning the September 2019 issue due to health issues and later died from breast cancer on August 4, 2019.

Viz Media licensed the series in English and released the first five volumes under their Viz Kids imprint. The first volume was released with a sticker set.

Drama CD 
A drama CD adaptation featuring ChocoMimi, along with Love-Berrish! and Animal Yokochō, was released as a mail-order gift with the December 2005 issue of Ribon, featuring the voices of Ami Koshimizu as Choco, Ai Nonaka as Mimi, Takayuki Sasada as Ando, and Motoki Takagi as Mumu.

Television drama

The manga was adapted into a live-action television drama series. The series was directed by Yoka Kusano and aired weekly for 26 episodes on TV Tokyo from October 1, 2007 to March 31, 2008 at 5:30 PM. Each episode was divided into two parts and used flash animation for effects and animated segments. ChocoMimi starred a number of child and teen newcomer actors, with its main cast composed of Yukika Teramoto as Choco, AKB48 member Kayano Masuyama as Mimi, Yuya Kido as Andrew, Tōko Miura as Mumu, and Masahiro Usui as Mikachin.

The opening theme, "Happy Happy!", was performed by Teramoto and Masuyama under the name Choco & Mimi, which charted #175 on the Oricon Weekly Singles Chart upon release. The ending themes are "I Can't!!" by Mystic for episodes 1-13; and "Rocket" by Teramoto, Masuyama, Yuya Kido, Tōko Miura, and Masahiro Usui under the name Choco & Mimi with Andrew, Mumu, and Mikachin for episodes 14-26.

Episodes

Reception

In Japan, ChocoMimi was popular among its target demographic of elementary and junior high students. The fashion focus of the series has been compared to Love and Berry: Dress Up and Dance!, while Choco and Mimi's friendship was compared to Nana and Hachi's from Nana. Lori Henderson from School Library Journal reviewed the series favorably, approving of its "short and sweet" stories and emphasis on friendship, while recommending the series to children in the 9-12 age group. On the other hand, Katherine Dacey from School Library Journal criticized Choco and Mimi's characterization for enforcing negative stereotypes of teen girls as "materialistic, ditzy, and uninterested in school" and felt "bothered" about the stories where Choco and Mimi were concerned about their weight. Publishers Weekly recommended the series specifically to preteen girls, especially ones interested in Japanese culture.

References

External links
 TV Tokyo's official site for ChocoMimi 
 

2003 manga
Japanese television dramas based on manga
Shōjo manga
Shueisha manga
TV Tokyo original programming
Viz Media manga
Yonkoma